In Greek mythology, Areilycus was the name of two mythical personages in Homer's Iliad

 Areilycus, one was the father of Archesilaus and Prothoenor. He is more commonly known as Archilycus.
 Areilycus, son of Menoetius, who was wounded in the thigh while fleeing by Patroclus. The spear broke Areilycus's bone, and the text strongly implies that Areilycus dies from his wound. Areilycus is frequently referenced as one character in the Iliad whose death does not have any metaphor or symbolism about it, and whose involvement in the narrative seems to be a plain description of action.

Notes

References 

 Diodorus Siculus, The Library of History translated by Charles Henry Oldfather. Twelve volumes. Loeb Classical Library. Cambridge, Massachusetts: Harvard University Press; London: William Heinemann, Ltd. 1989. Vol. 3. Books 4.59–8. Online version at Bill Thayer's Web Site
 Diodorus Siculus, Bibliotheca Historica. Vol 1-2. Immanel Bekker. Ludwig Dindorf. Friedrich Vogel. in aedibus B. G. Teubneri. Leipzig. 1888-1890. Greek text available at the Perseus Digital Library.
 Gaius Julius Hyginus, Fabulae from The Myths of Hyginus translated and edited by Mary Grant. University of Kansas Publications in Humanistic Studies. Online version at the Topos Text Project.

Trojans
Boeotian characters in Greek mythology
Locrian characters in Greek mythology